Cherepanovsky is a rural locality (a settlement) in Cherepanovsky Selsoviet, Zmeinogorsky District, Altai Krai, Russia. The population was 365 as of 2013. There are 3 streets.

Geography 
Cherepanovsky is located 12 km northeast of Zmeinogorsk (the district's administrative centre) by road. Bespalovsky is the nearest rural locality.

References 

Rural localities in Zmeinogorsky District